The  is an art museum in Yōga, Setagaya, Tokyo. The museum, which opened March 30, 1986, houses a permanent gallery and mounts seasonal exhibitions.

Structure

The main building of the museum, a contemporary design by architect Shōzō Uchii, is on a corner of Kinuta Park at 1-2 Kinutakōen, Setagaya, Tokyo.

Collections

The gallery's permanent collection contains a great number of photographs, particularly by Kineo Kuwabara and (numbering in the hundreds) Kōji Morooka. An unusually large exhibition was "Love You Tokyo" (Rabu Yū Tōkyō) of 1993, which brought together 265 works by Kuwabara and 1479 by Nobuyoshi Araki.

Annexes

The Setagaya Art Museum maintains three annexes, all within Setagaya Ward.

 The Junkichi Mukai Annex, dedicated to Junkichi Mukai (1901 – 1995), was established in 1993 and is located in the Tsurumaki area of Setagaya.
 The Taiji Kiyokawa Memorial Gallery, dedicated to Taiji Kiyokawa (1919 – 2000), was established in 1995 and is located in the Seijō area of Setagaya.
 The Saburō Miyamoto Memorial Gallery, dedicated to Saburō Miyamoto (1905 – 1974), was established in 2004 and is located in the Okusawa area of Setagaya.

Access

The Setagaya Art Museum is accessible from the Yōga Station on the Tōkyū Den'en-toshi Line.

Notes

References

Matsumoto Norihiko, ed. Nihon no bijutsukan to shashin korekushon (Japan's art galleries and photography collections). Kyoto: Tankōsha, 2002. . Pp. 54–57.

External links

Setagaya Art Museum 
Kiyokawa annex 
Miyamoto annex 
Mukai annex

Art museums and galleries in Tokyo
Art museums established in 1986
1986 establishments in Japan
Postmodern architecture in Japan
Buildings and structures in Setagaya